The  is an archaeological site consisting shallow pits from which obsidian had been mined during the  Jōmon period. It is located in the Daimon neighborhood of the town of Nagawa in the Chūbu region Japan. It has been protected as a National Historic Site since 2001.

Overview
The Hoshikuso Pass is located northwest of Mount Kirigamine and northeast of Lake Suwa, in an area where numerous Japanese Paleolithic remains have been found. Obsidian, or "volcanic glass" was frequently used for stone tools and weapons in the Paleolithic and Jōmon periods as it could be easily fractured by lithic reduction to produce sharp blades or arrowheads. Obsidian occurs in certain volcanic formation around Japan, and obsidian artifacts from Nagano Prefecture have been found widely distributed to many distant regions of Japan, indicating that some form of long distance trade has existed even from the Paleolithic period.

The Hoshikuso Pass obsidian mine site is located at an elevation of 500 to 1500 meters, with the obsidian distributed all over the slope in a 220-meter north-to-south by 300 meter east-to-west orientation. Within this area archaeologists have found numerous crater-shaped shallow indentations, each about ten meters in diameter and two to three meters in depth. Some craters overlap, and others have their sides reinforced with embossed stones and debris. The site also contains the remains of a workshop with a hearth, and numerous fragments and lithic cores and shards created by the knapping of obsidian into stone tools. It is not possible to accurately establish the dates during which the site was used, but it is estimated that it was functional since the earliest Jōmon period to the final Jōmon period.

The area is open to the public as a historic park with a walkway and explanatory placards. At the foot of the pass is the  operated by Nagawa Town, in connection with the Obsidian Research Center of Meiji University, which opened in 2004.  It is approximately one hour by car from Chino Station on the JR East Chūō Main Line.

See also
List of Historic Sites of Japan (Nagano)

References

External links
Nagawa town official site 
phamplet by Nagano Prefectural Government
Obsidian Experience Museum

Nagawa, Nagano
Jōmon period
Archaeological sites in Japan
History of Nagano Prefecture
Historic Sites of Japan
Mines in Japan
Obsidian